Jacob Everett Shaffelburg (born November 26, 1999) is a Canadian professional soccer player who plays as a winger for Major League Soccer club Nashville SC and the Canadian national team.

Early life
Shaffelburg played youth soccer for Valley United SC and Team Nova Scotia. In 2012, he joined FC Nashville Heroes, where he played in the 2012 U.S. Club Soccer National Cup. In January 2014, he joined the Sporting Kansas City Academy, where he played for a month. At age 15, he began attending high school in Massachusetts at the Berkshire School, where he played for their highly regarded soccer program. He played an instrumental part in the team, scoring four goals in two games in the NEPSAC playoffs his senior year (2018), helping Berkshire win their fifth title in seven years and he was named 2017–18 Gatorade Massachusetts Boys Soccer Player of the Year. While in the US, he also played youth soccer with Manhattan SC where he won U.S. Club Soccer U-16 National Championship in 2016.

He joined the Toronto FC Academy in 2016. He appeared in a friendly for the HFX Wanderers FC Atlantic Selects team in 2018 against Fortuna Düsseldorf's U-21 team, where he scored a goal. He had originally committed to the University of Virginia on a soccer scholarship, but ultimately decided to sign a professional contract instead.

Club career
He played a game with Toronto FC III in League1 Ontario in 2017.

In 2018, he played with Black Rock FC in the Premier Development League.  He finished as the team's leading scorer with eight goals, tied with Ifunanyachi Achara.

On November 28, 2018, he signed his first professional contract with Toronto FC II and began the 2019 season with them in USL League One.

Shaffelburg made his first appearance for Toronto FC in the 2019 CONCACAF Champions League on February 19, 2019 and then signed with Toronto FC as a Homegrown Player on June 21, 2019. He made his first MLS appearance the following day, playing 31 minutes against FC Dallas in Frisco, Texas. Four days later on June 26 he had his first start for Toronto FC at BMO Field scoring an assist in a 3–2 win against Atlanta United FC, setting up the fastest goal in TFC history only 29 seconds into the game. Shaffelburg would quickly find himself in the starting lineup shortly after signing, earning rave reviews for his pace from the coaching staff. He scored his first goal in the 74th minute on May 15, 2021, in a 1-1 draw against New York City. On September 3, he was loaned to Toronto FC II. Upon completion of the 2021 season, Shaffelburg's option for the 2022 season would be picked up by Toronto. He went on a short loan to the second team again in 2022.

In August 2022, Shaffelburg joined Nashville SC on loan for the remainder of the 2022 season, with an option for a permanent transfer in 2023. He made his debut for Nashville on August 21 against FC Dallas and scored a goal in a 4-0 victory. After the season, Nashville exercised the purchase option for the 2023 season and signed him to a four-year contract extension with a club option for 2027.

International career

Youth
Shaffelburg was named to the Canadian U-23 provisional roster for the 2020 CONCACAF Men's Olympic Qualifying Championship on February 26, 2020.

Senior
Shaffelburg received his first senior international call-up to Canada on January 3, 2020, for matches against Barbados and Iceland. On January 10, 2020, he made his debut as a substitute against Barbados.

Career statistics

Club

International

Honours

Club 
Toronto FC
 Canadian Championship: 2020

Individual 
 Canadian Championship Best Young Canadian Player Award: 2021

References

External links 
 

1999 births
Living people
Association football forwards
Canadian soccer players
Soccer people from Nova Scotia
People from Kentville, Nova Scotia
Toronto FC II players
Toronto FC players
Major League Soccer players
USL League One players
Canada men's international soccer players
Homegrown Players (MLS)
Berkshire School alumni
Nashville SC players
MLS Next Pro players
League1 Ontario players
USL League Two players